Jesswar, is a Fijian Australian artist based on Yugambeh/Kombumerri country. Jesswar's debut single, "Savage", released in 2017 and was followed by debut EP Tropixx in 2021 and debut mixtape LIFE'S SHORT, LIVE BIG in 2022. In 2021, Jesswar was a winner at the Queensland Music Awards and the APRA Professional Development Awards.

Early life
Born in Canberra, Jesswar grew up partly in Fiji and partly on the Gold Coast, Queensland. They left home at 16 years old, studying music at TAFE Queensland, and later at the Queensland Conservatorium Griffith University. In 2012 Jesswar formed a four-piece pop rap band, Sneeky Picnic, with fellow students.

Music career

2017-present: TROPIXX & Life’s Short, Live Big

Jesswar's first release as a solo artist was "Savage" in 2017, though they later signed with Golden Era Records. In 2018 Jesswar performed at St Jerome's Laneway Festival. By 2019, they had collaborated with artists including Tasha the Amazon, Okenyo, DZ Deathrays, and B Wise.

In 2021, Jesswar signed a global deal with PIAS Recordings and also released debut EP Tropixx. The EP the singles "Medusa" and "Venom", the latter of which won in the hip hop/rap category at the 2021 Queensland Music Awards. Later that year, they released the lead single from their debut mixtape: a Rihanna-inspired collaboration with viral Texan rapper Erica Banks: "Bad Like Riri".. The single gained significant traction and is trap-laced celebration of strong, unapologetic voices and the self-possessed mindset of a baddie.
 
Stylistically, Jesswar’s debut mixtape, LIFE’S SHORT, LIVE BIG (released on September 23, 2022) lives out the bold, carpe diem-style ethos implied by its title - apt for an artist whose sound is constantly evolving, always coming into itself. Thematically, the record is no less ravenous, carried primarily by Jesswar’s undiluted charisma. The low-slung ‘SWEET’, featuring producer and vocalist DVNA, places fierce declarations of romantic devotion and dedication in its verses up against honeyed, love-drunk gratitude in the chorus.
  
Immersed is exactly how Jesswar sounds on ‘FELL IN LOVE,’ the second single released from the mixtape, with each element of the track wrapped up in the affection that they sing of - from the gossamer backdrop of gliding, funk-polished guitars to the  slinky cadence of the chorus and velvety, sultry flow of the verses.
 
On the raucous ‘ANTISOCIAL’, Jesswar offers an impassioned screed against social injustices, drawing the line between their lived experiences and generations of preceding trauma, a melee of sirens, growling sub-bass and industrial percussion swirling around them. Elsewhere, they effortlessly switch into new and at times unexpected gears, as on the warped, club-ready bounce of ‘THROW IT IN THE AIR’ or the sweltering, carnal longing of ‘CANDY’, backed by pitched-up R&B vocal samples and delivered in a borderline whisper. Audacious and bumping, third single ‘HEFTY’ is a vintage New York rap cut, featuring stark, staccato strikes of piano over a pared-back beat, with boastful, chest-heavy lyricism and a sneer, while ‘CARAMEL BARS’ is yet another potent, one-and-a-half minute display of Jesswar’s technical abilities, their steely flow riding a tough and immediate minimalist beat.

Discography

Mixtapes

Extended Play

Awards and nominations

AIR Awards
The Australian Independent Record Awards (commonly known informally as AIR Awards) is an annual awards night to recognise, promote and celebrate the success of Australia's Independent Music sector.

! 
|-
| 2022
| Tropixx
| Best Independent Hip Hop Album or EP
| 
|

Rolling Stone Australia Awards
The Rolling Stone Australia Awards are awarded annually in January or February by the Australian edition of Rolling Stone magazine for outstanding contributions to popular culture in the previous year.

! 
|-
| 2022
| Jesswar
| Best New Artist
| 
| 
|-

References

1990s births
Australian people of Fijian descent
Australian women rappers
Fijian musicians
LGBT rappers
Living people
Musicians from Canberra
Year of birth missing (living people)